John Bunn may refer to:
 John Bunn (basketball), American basketball coach
 John Bunn (exonerated prisoner), African American man wrongfully convicted of a murder
 John Whitfield Bunn, American industrialist